Tantamani (Neo-Assyrian:), also known as Tanutamun or Tanwetamani (d. 653 BC) was ruler of the Kingdom of Kush located in Northern Sudan, and the last pharaoh of the Twenty-fifth Dynasty of Egypt. His prenomen or royal name was Bakare, which means "Glorious is the Soul of Re."

Filiation

He was the son of King Shabaka and the nephew of his predecessor Taharqa. In some sources he is said to be the son of Shebitku. Assyrian records call Tantamani a son of Shabaka and refer to his mother, Qalhata, as a sister of Taharqa. Some Egyptologists interpreted the Assyrian text as stating that Tantamani was a son of Shebitku, but it is now more common to consider Tantamani a son of Shabaka.

Conflict with Ashurbanipal of Assyria

Soon after the Assyrians had appointed Necho I as king and left, Tantamani invaded Egypt in hopes of restoring his family to the throne. Tantamani marched down the Nile from Nubia and reoccupied all of Egypt, including Memphis. Necho I, the Assyrians' representative, was killed in Tantamani's campaign.

This led to a renewed conflict with Ashurbanipal in 663 BCE. The Assyrians led by Ashurbanipal returned to Egypt in force. Together with Psamtik I's army, which included Carian mercenaries, they fought a pitched battle in north Memphis, close to the temple of Isis, between the Serapeum and Abusir. Tantamani was defeated and fled to Upper Egypt. Forty days after the battle, Ashurbanipal's army arrived in Thebes. The city of Thebes was conquered, "smashed (as if by) a floodstorm" and heavily plundered in the Sack of Thebes. The event is not mentioned in Egyptian sources, but is known from the Assyrian annals, which report that the inhabitants were deported. The Assyrians took a large booty of gold, silver, precious stones, clothes, horses, fantastic animals, as well as two obelisks covered in electrum weighing 2.500 talents (c. 75.5 tons, or 166,500 lb):

The sack of Thebes was a momentous event that reverberated throughout the Ancient Near East. It is mentioned in the Book of Nahum chapter 3:8-10:

A prophecy in the Book of Isaiah refers to the sack as well:

The Assyrian reconquest effectively ended Nubian control over Egypt, although Tantamani's authority was still recognised in Upper Egypt until his 8th Year in 656 BCE, when Psamtik I's navy peacefully took control of Thebes and effectively unified all of Egypt. These events marked the start of the Twenty-sixth Dynasty of Egypt.

Later rule
Thereafter, Tantamani ruled only Nubia (Kush). He died in 653 BC and was succeeded by Atlanersa, a son of Taharqa. He was buried in the family cemetery at El-Kurru. The archaeologist Charles Bonnet discovered the statue of Tantamani at Kerma (now called Doukki Gel) in 2003.

Tomb in El-Kurru
The tomb of Tantamani was located below a pyramid, now disappeared, at the site of El-Kurru. Only the entrance and the chambers remain, which are beautifully decorated with mural paintings.

Artifacts

See also
 List of monarchs of Kush

References

Further reading

653 BC deaths
7th-century BC Pharaohs
7th-century BC monarchs of Kush
Pharaohs of the Twenty-fifth Dynasty of Egypt
Egyptian people of Nubian descent
Kingdom of Kush
Year of birth unknown